Chow Chang Sing (28 May 1916–1994) was a Chinese athlete. He competed in the men's decathlon at the 1936 Summer Olympics.

His father was Zhou Dawen.

References

External links
 

1916 births
1994 deaths
Athletes (track and field) at the 1936 Summer Olympics
Chinese decathletes
Olympic athletes of China
Place of birth missing